Brucella tritici is a species of bacteria first isolated from wheat rhizoplane. Its type strain is SCII24T (= LMG 18957T = DSM 13340T).

References

Further reading

Teyssier C. and Jumas-Bilak E. Ochrobactrum. in Molecular Detection of Bacterial Pathogens. Edited by Dongyou Liu. Taylor's and Fancis. 2010

Thoma, Bryan, et al. "Identification and antimicrobial susceptibilities of Ochrobactrum spp." International Journal of Medical Microbiology 299.3 (2009): 209–220.

External links

LPSN
Type strain of Ochrobactrum tritici at BacDive -  the Bacterial Diversity Metadatabase

Hyphomicrobiales
Bacteria described in 2000